Simon Travis (born 22 March 1977) is an English former professional footballer. He played on both the right and left sides in a full-back or midfield role, and was capped by the England C national football team under Paul Fairclough.

Career
Travis started his career in the Football League with a season at Division Three side Torquay United. He then spent two seasons in Division One at Stockport. After leaving Stockport he spent a total of seven seasons in the Conference with Telford United, Forest Green Rovers and Stevenage, combining football with his studies at university. He joined Hereford in February 2004.

His signing coincided with the beginning of an 11-game unbeaten run in the Conference although the team missed out on promotion. The following season he was a regular at full-back and scored on the first day of the season. However the summer of 2005 was not a good time for Travis. Hereford went out of the playoffs in the semi-finals and then sustained a serious injury while playing for England in the Four Nations Tournament. He suffered a collapsed lung and broken ribs which put him out of action for several months. Once he returned he played a key role in a team that won promotion to the Football League via the playoffs, and played in the final, where Hereford defeated Halifax Town 3–2.

The 2006–07 season saw him compete for the right back position with Trent McClenahan, with Travis making more appearances over the course of the season. A proposed loan move to Stockport fell through in the second half of the season.
 
He spent the 2007–08 season at Nuneaton Borough, and when the club folded in the summer of 2008 he joined Solihull Moors. A year later spent a short period of time at Leamington, later playing for Brackley Town.

External links

1977 births
Living people
Footballers from Preston, Lancashire
English footballers
England semi-pro international footballers
Association football defenders
Torquay United F.C. players
Stockport County F.C. players
Telford United F.C. players
Forest Green Rovers F.C. players
Stevenage F.C. players
Hereford United F.C. players
Nuneaton Borough F.C. players
Solihull Moors F.C. players
Leamington F.C. players
Brackley Town F.C. players
English Football League players
National League (English football) players